Events from the year 1980 in the United Kingdom.

Incumbents
Monarch – Elizabeth II
Prime Minister – Margaret Thatcher (Conservative)
Parliament – 48th

Events

January
 2 January – Workers at British Steel Corporation go on a nationwide strike over pay called by the Iron and Steel Trades Confederation, which has some 90,000 members among British Steel's 150,000 workforce, in a bid to get a 20% rise. It is the first steelworks strike since 1926.
 19 January – The first UK Indie Chart is published in Record Business.
 20 January – The British record TV audience for a film is set when some 23,500,000 viewers tune in for the ITV showing of the James Bond film Live and Let Die (1973).
 21 January –  is beached at Brighton.
 28 January – Granada Television airs a controversial edition of World in Action on ITV, in which it alleges that Manchester United F.C. chairman Louis Edwards has made unauthorised payments to the parents of some of the club's younger players and has made shady deals to win local council meat contracts for his retail outlet chain.

February
 14 February – Margaret Thatcher announces that state benefit to strikers will be halved.
 14–23 February – Great Britain and Northern Ireland compete at the Winter Olympics in Lake Placid, New York, United States, and win one gold medal (Robin Cousins for figure skating).
 17 February – British Steel Corporation announces that more than 11,000 jobs will be axed at its plants in Wales by the end of next month.
 25 February
 The First episode of the popular political sitcom Yes Minister is broadcast on BBC2. 
 Manchester United chairman Louis Edwards dies from a heart attack at the age of 65, just weeks after allegations about his dealings in connection with the football club and with his retail outlet chain.

March
 10 March – An opinion poll conducted by the Evening Standard suggests that six out of 10 Britons are dissatisfied with Margaret Thatcher's Conservative government, who now trail Labour (still led by James Callaghan, the former prime minister) in the opinion polls.
 19–20 March – Radio Caroline, the pirate radio station, is forced to cease transmission when , the ship on which it is based, runs aground and sinks off the Thames Estuary.
 25 March
 The British Olympic Association votes to defy the government by sending athletes to the Olympic Games to be held in Moscow, USSR in the summer.
 Robert Runcie enthroned as Archbishop of Canterbury.
 26 March – The budget raises tax allowances and duties on petrol, alcohol and tobacco.
 31 March
 British Leyland agrees to sell the MG cars factory at Abingdon to a consortium headed by Aston Martin-Lagonda when the plant closes this Autumn. 
 National Heritage Act sets up the National Heritage Memorial Fund.
 March – Vauxhall, launches the Astra, a front-wheel drive small family hatchback which replaces the recently discontinued Viva and is based on the latest Opel Kadett. Although the car is currently produced in West Germany and Belgium, there are plans for British production to commence at the Ellesmere Port plant in Cheshire next year.

April
 1 April – The steelworkers' strike is called off.
 2 April – 1980 St Pauls riot in Bristol.
 3 April – Education Act institutes the Assisted Places Scheme (free or subsidised places for children attending fee-paying independent schools based on results in the schools' entrance examination and means tests), gives parents greater powers on governing bodies and over admissions, and removes local education authorities' obligation to provide school milk and meals.
 4 April – Alton Towers Resort is opened by Madame Tussauds in Staffordshire as a theme park.
 10 April – The UK reaches an agreement with Spain to reopen its border with Gibraltar.
 18 April – Zimbabwe becomes independent of the United Kingdom.
 22 April – Unemployment stands at a two-year high of more than 1.5million.
 30 April – The Iranian Embassy Siege begins. A six-man terrorist team from the Democratic Revolutionary Front for the Liberation of Arabistan captures the Embassy of Iran in Prince's Gate, Knightsbridge, central London, taking 26 hostages.

May
 1 May – British Aerospace privatised.
 3 May – Liverpool win the Football League First Division title for 12th time.
 5 May – The SAS storm the Iranian Embassy building, killing 5 out of the 6 terrorists. One hostage is killed by the terrorists before the raid and one during it, but the remainder are freed. The events are broadcast live on television.
 10 May – West Ham United, of the Second Division, win the FA Cup for the third time in its history with a surprise 1–0 victory over First Division Arsenal in the final at Wembley Stadium. Trevor Brooking scores the only goal of the game to make West Ham United the third team from the Second Division to have won the trophy in the last eight years. As of 2021, West Ham are the last team from outside the top division to have won the FA Cup.
 16 May – Inflation has risen to 21.8%.
 27 May – Inquest into the death of New Zealand born teacher Blair Peach (who was killed during a demonstration against the National Front last year) returns a verdict of misadventure, resulting in a public outcry.
 28 May – Nottingham Forest retain the European Cup with a 1–0 win over Hamburger SV, the West German league champions, in Madrid. The winning goal is scored by Scotland international John Robertson. The European Cup has now been won by an English club for the fourth successive year, as Liverpool won it for two consecutive years before Forest's first victory last year.

June
 June
 British Leyland launches its Morris Ital range of family saloons and estates which are a reworking of the nine-year-old Marina that was one of Britain's most popular cars during the 1970s. Production is expected to finish by 1984 when an all-new front-wheel drive model is added to the range and sales begin on 1 August, the same day that the new W-registered cars go on sale.
 The UK economy slides into recession.
 6 June – Two Malaysian men are jailed for 14 years after being found guilty of running a drug smuggling ring in London which generated millions of pounds.
 12 June – Gail Kinchen (a pregnant 16-year-old) and her unborn baby are accidentally shot dead by a police marksman who enters the Birmingham flat where her boyfriend David Pagett is holding her hostage at gunpoint. 
 16 June – Murder of Patsy Morris, a 14-year-old schoolgirl from Isleworth found dead on Hounslow Heath. Her murder remains unsolved although in 2008 it was revealed that she was the childhood girlfriend of serial killer Levi Bellfield, responsible for the Murder of Milly Dowler.
 17 June – Secretary of State for Defence Francis Pym reveals to the House of Commons that US nuclear cruise missiles are to be located at RAF Greenham Common in Berkshire and the disused RAF Molesworth base in Cambridgeshire.
 19 June – Gunmen attack the British embassy in Iraq; three unknown attackers are shot dead by Iraqi security forces.
 23 June – Insider trading in shares becomes illegal under United Kingdom company law.
 24 June – Unemployment is announced to have reached a postwar high of 1,600,000.
 26 June – The Glasgow Central by-election is held, with Labour retaining its hold on the seat despite a swing of 14% to the Scottish National Party.
 30 June – The pre-decimal sixpence coin is withdrawn from circulation.

July
 1 July – MG's Abingdon car factory looks set to close completely this Autumn as Aston Martin fails to raise the funds to buy it from British Leyland.
 8 July – Miners threatening to strike demand a 37% pay increase, ignoring pleas from Margaret Thatcher to hold down wage claims.
 10 July – Alexandra Palace in London gutted by fire.
 19 July–3 August: Great Britain and Northern Ireland compete at the Olympics in Moscow and win 5 gold, 7 silver and 9 bronze medals.
 22 July – Unemployment has hit a 44-year high of nearly 1.9 million.
 29 July – Margaret Thatcher announces the introduction of Enterprise Zones as an employment relief effort in some of regions of Britain which have been hardest hit by deindustrialisation and unemployment.

August
 11 August 
 Margaret Thatcher visits the Harold Hill area of East London to hand of the keys to the 12,000th council tenants in Britain to buy their home under the right to buy scheme. However, she is met by jeering from neighbours of the family.
 Tyne and Wear Metro opens on Tyneside after 6 years construction, with the first phase between Haymarket in Newcastle and Whitley Bay.
 16 August – 37 people die as a result of the Denmark Place fire, arson at adjacent London nightclubs.
 28 August – Unemployment now stands at 2 million for the first time since 1935. Economists warn that it could rise to up to 2.5million by the end of next year.

September
 1 September – Ford launches one of the most important new cars of the year, the third generation Escort which is a technological innovation in the small family car market, spelling the end of the traditional rear-wheel drive saloon in favour of the front-wheel drive hatchback and estate that follows a trend in this sector of car which is being repeated all over Western Europe. It would go on to be Britain's best-selling car of the decade starting from 1982. 
 9 September – Bibby Line's Liverpool-registered ore-bulk-oil carrier MV Derbyshire sinks with the loss of all 44 crew south off Japan in Typhoon Orchid following structural failure. At 91,655 gross tons, she is the largest UK-registered ship ever lost.
 11 September – Chicago mobster Joseph Scalise with Arthur Rachel commit the Marlborough diamond robbery in London. The following day, they are arrested in Chicago after getting off a British Airways flight in the city; however, the 45-carat stone is never found.
 12 September – Consett Steelworks in Consett, County Durham closes with the loss of 4500 jobs, instantly making it the town with the highest rate of unemployment in the UK. 
 13 September – Hercules, a bear which had gone missing on a Scottish island filming a Kleenex advertisement, is found.
 21 September – First CND rally at RAF Greenham Common.
 24 September – 34-year-old Singapore born doctor Upadhya Bandara is attacked and injured in Headingley, Leeds; the Yorkshire Ripper is believed to have been responsible.

October
 3 October – The 1980 Housing Act comes into effect, giving council house tenants of three years' standing in England and Wales the right to buy their home from their local council at a discount.
 6 October – Deregulation of express coach services.
 8 October – British Leyland launches the Austin Metro, a small three-door hatchback which makes use of much of the Mini's drivetrain and suspension, including its 998 cc and 1275 cc engines. The Mini will continue to be produced alongside the Metro at Longbridge in Birmingham which was recently expanded to accommodate Metro production.
 10 October – Margaret Thatcher makes her "The lady's not for turning" speech to the Conservative Party conference after party MP's warn that her economic policy was responsible for the current recession and rising unemployment.
 15 October
 James Callaghan, ousted as Prime Minister by the Conservative victory 17 months ago, resigns as Labour Party leader after four and a half years.
 Former Prime Minister Harold Macmillan, 86, criticises Margaret Thatcher's economic policies, claiming that she has "got the wrong answer" to the economic crises which she inherited from Labour last year. Her economic policies are also criticised by union leaders, who blame her policies for rising unemployment and bankruptcies, and warn that this could result in civil unrest.
 17 October – Elizabeth II makes history by becoming the first British monarch to make a state visit to the Vatican.
 22 October – Lord Thomson announces that The Times and Sunday Times will be closed down within five months unless a buyer is found.
 24 October – MG car production ends after 56 years with the closure of the plant in Abingdon, Oxfordshire, where more than 1.1 million MG cars have been built since it opened in 1924.
 28 October – Margaret Thatcher declares that the government will not give in to seven jailed IRA terrorists who are on hunger strike in the Maze Prison in hope of winning prisoner of war status.

November
 5 November – Theresa Sykes, a 16-year-old Huddersfield mother of a young baby, is wounded in a hammer attack near her home in the town. The Yorkshire Ripper is believed to be responsible.
 10 November – Michael Foot is elected Leader of the Labour Party.
 13 November – George Smith, a security guard, is shot dead when the van he is guarding is intercepted by armed robbers in Willenhall, West Midlands. 
 17 November – University student Jacqueline Hill, aged 20, is murdered in Headingley, Leeds. On 19 November, police investigating the case establish that she is probably the 13th woman to be killed by the Yorkshire Ripper.
 23 November – Despite the economy now being in recession and the government's monetarist economic policy to tackle inflation being blamed for the downturn, the government announces further public spending cuts and taxation rises.

December
 8 December – John Lennon is shot dead in New York.
 10 December – Frederick Sanger wins his second Nobel Prize in Chemistry, jointly with Walter Gilbert, "for their contributions concerning the determination of base sequences in nucleic acids".
 14 December – Thousands of music fans hold a 10-minute vigil in Liverpool for John Lennon.
 18 December – Michael Foot's hopes of becoming prime minister in the next general election are given a boost by an MORI poll which shows Labour on 56% with a 24-point lead over the Conservatives.
 23 December – American animated special Rudolph the Red-Nosed Reindeer airs on ITV for the last time until 2020 when it airs on December 26. 
 26 & 28 December – Sightings of unexplained lights near RAF Woodbridge Suffolk, which become known as the Rendlesham Forest incident, the most well-known claimed UFO event in Britain.
 28 December – The Independent Broadcasting Authority award contracts for commercial broadcasting on ITV. TV-am is awarded the first ever breakfast TV contract, and is set to go on air by 1983.

Undated
 Inflation has risen to 18% as Margaret Thatcher's battle against inflation is still in its early stages.
 The economy contracts throughout the year, shrinking by 4% overall with the greatest decline occurring in the second quarter of the year at 1.8%.
 Britain becomes self-sufficient in oil.
 Transcendental Meditation movement community established in Skelmersdale.

Publications
 Douglas Adams' novel The Restaurant at the End of the Universe, second of The Hitchhiker's Guide to the Galaxy "trilogy".
 Julian Barnes' first novel Metroland.
 Anthony Burgess's novel Earthly Powers.
 The Church of England's Alternative Service Book.
 William Golding's novel Rites of Passage, first of the To the Ends of the Earth trilogy.
 David Lodge's novel How Far Can You Go?.
 Iris Murdoch's novel Nuns and Soldiers.
 Barry Unsworth's novel Pascali's Island.
 Benjamin Zephaniah's first poetry collection Pen Rhythm.

Births
 1 January – Richie Faulkner, rock guitarist (Judas Priest) 
 2 January - Kemi Badenoch, politician
 8 January – Sam Riley, actor
 18 January – Estelle, singer
 19 January – D Double E, grime MC
 20 January
 Jenson Button, racing driver
 Matthew Tuck, singer/songwriter and frontman for Bullet for My Valentine
 21 January – Nicky Booth, boxer (died 2021)
 30 January – Leilani Dowding, English 'Page 3' model and television celebrity
 5 February – Jo Swinson, Scottish politician, leader of the Liberal Democrats (UK)
 10 February 
 Matt Irwin, photographer (died 2016)
Ralf Little, footballer and actor
Steve Tully, footballer

 22 February – Martin Garratt, footballer (died 2014)
 2 March – Chris Barker, footballer (died 2020)
 13 March – Linda Clement, Scottish field hockey player
 21 March – John Hinds, Northern Irish motorcycle race doctor, antitheist and lecturer (died 2015)
 23 March – Russell Howard, English comedian, television and radio presenter
 24 March – Amanda Davies, sports presenter
 28 March – Angela Rayner, Labour politician
 29 March – Andy Scott-Lee, Welsh singer (3SL) and Pop Idol (series 2) contestant
 3 April – Suella Braverman, Conservative politician, Home Secretary
 8 April
 Ben Freeman, actor
 Cheryl Valentine, Scottish field hockey midfielder
 15 April – Natalie Casey, English actress
 25 April – Lee Spick, snooker player (died 2015)
 2 May – Zat Knight, English footballer
 8 May – Michelle McManus, Scottish singer, winner of Pop Idol (series 2) and television host
 9 May – Kate Richardson-Walsh, English field hockey player
 12 May – Rishi Sunak, Conservative politician, Prime Minister 
 22 May – Lucy Gordon, actress and model (died 2009)
 30 May – Steven Gerrard, footballer

 1 June
 Martin Devaney, footballer
 Oliver James, actor
 2 June – Richard Skuse, rugby player
 4 June – Philip Olivier, actor
 10 June 
 Jovanka Houska, chess master
 James Walsh, singer-songwriter, guitarist and pianist 
 11 June 
 Ernie Cooksey, footballer (died 2008)
 Michael Lockett, soldier (died 2009)
 14 June – Alexandra Aitken, English citizen, environmental campaigner, model, actress, artist and socialite
 22 June – Charlene White, television presenter and newsreader 
 23 June – Jessica Taylor, singer (Liberty X)
 27 June
 Jeremy Swift, English television actor
 David Cholmondeley, 7th Marquess of Cholmondeley, British peer and filmmaker
 28 June – Richard Rycroft, actor and comedian
 29 June – Katherine Jenkins, mezzo-soprano
 1 July – Ricky Champ, actor 
 7 July – Jim McMahon, politician
 8 July – Nikesh Shukla, author 
 18 July 
 Gareth Emery, trance producer and DJ  
 Tasmin Lucia-Khan, television news presenter 
 Scott James Remnant, engineer 
 19 July – Michelle Heaton, English singer (Liberty X)  
 28 July – Leo Houlding, English rock climber
 3 August – Hannah Simone, British-Canadian actress  
 19 August  
Adam Campbell, actor
Darius Campbell Danesh, Scottish singer-songwriter and actor (died 2022 in the United States)
 23 August – Joanne Froggatt, English actress of stage
 28 August – Rachel Khoo, chef, writer and broadcaster
 6 September – Kerry Katona, TV presenter and pop star (Atomic Kitten) 
 11 September – Anthony Carrigan, academic (died 2016)
 12 September – Kevin Sinfield, English rugby league player
 14 October – Ben Whishaw, actor
 26 October – Khalid Abdalla, Scottish-born actor
 28 October – Alan Smith, footballer
 12 November – Charlie Hodgson, English rugby union player
 18 November - Mathew Baynton, English actor
 19 November
Andrew Copson, businessman
Adele Silva, actress
 6 December – Steve Lovell, footballer
 7 December – John Terry, footballer
 8 December – Nick Nevern, actor and director
 15 December 
 Neil McDermott, actor
 Sergio Pizzorno, guitarist and songwriter 
 16 December – Michael Jibson, actor, voice over artist, writer and director
 18 December – Neil Fingleton, actor and basketball player (died 2017)
 20 December
Steve Coast, entrepreneur, founder of OpenStreetMap
Ashley Cole, footballer
Fitz Hall, footballer
 21 December – Louise Linton, Scottish actress, wife of Steven Mnuchin
 25 December – Laura Sadler, television actress (died 2003)

Deaths
 6 January – Raymond Mays, racing car driver and businessman (born 1899)
 11 January – Barbara Pym, novelist (born 1913)
 18 January – Sir Cecil Beaton, photographer (born 1904)
 27January – Sir Eric Wyndham White, British administrator and economist, first Director-General of the GATT (born 1913)
 4 February – Edith Summerskill, physician, feminist, Labour politician and campaigner (born 1901)
 9 February – Tom Macdonald, journalist and novelist (born 1900)
 17 February – Graham Sutherland, artist (born 1903)
 1 March – Dixie Dean, football player (born 1907)
 7 March – John Illingworth, yachtsman, yacht designer and naval officer (born 1903)
 18 March – Ludwig Guttmann, neurologist and pioneer of paralympic games (born 1899 in Germany)
 6 April – John Collier, writer (born 1901) 
 8 April – Bill Eastman, army officer (born 1911)
 19 April – Tony Beckley, character actor (born 1927)
 26 April – Cicely Courtneidge, actress (born 1893)
 27 April – John Culshaw, British recording producer and musicologist (b. 1924)  
 29 April – Alfred Hitchcock, film director (born 1899)
 7 May 
 Isla Cameron, actress (b. 1930)
 Margaret Cole, politician (b. 1893)
 8 May – Geoffrey Baker, English field marshal (b. 1912)
 14 May – Hugh Griffith, actor (born 1912)
 18 May – Ian Curtis, post-punk musician and singer (Joy Division) (born 1956)
 25 May – George West, Anglican missionary (born 1893)
 7 June – Elizabeth Craig, writer (born 1883)
 12 June – Billy Butlin, founder of Butlins holiday camps (born 1899 in South Africa)
 23 June – John Laurie, actor (born 1897)
 1 July – C. P. Snow, novelist and physicist (born 1905)
 4 July – Gregory Bateson, anthropologist, anthropologist, social scientist, linguist, semiotician and cyberneticist (b. 1904)
 7 July – Reginald Gardiner, actor (born 1903) 
 24 July – Peter Sellers, comic actor (born 1925)
 26 July – Kenneth Tynan, theatre critic (born 1927)
 20 August – Dame Lucy Sutherland, historian, academic (born 1903 in Australia)
 22 August – Norman Shelley, actor (born 1903)
 24 August – Yootha Joyce, actress (born 1927)
 5 September – Adrian Bell, farmer, writer and crossword compiler (born 1901)
 25 September – John Bonham, drummer (Led Zeppelin) (born 1948)
 6 October – Hattie Jacques, comic actress (heart attack) (born 1922)
 4 November – Johnny Owen, boxer (born 1956)
 8 November – Valerie Myerscough, mathematician and astrophysicist (born 1942)
 19 November – E. J. Bowen, chemist (born 1898)
 22 November – Norah McGuinness, painter and illustrator (born 1901)
 26 November – Rachel Roberts, actress (suicide) (born 1927)
 3 December – Oswald Mosley, leader of the British Union of Fascists (born 1896)
 8 December
 John Lennon, pop singer-songwriter and guitarist (The Beatles) (murdered in the United States) (born 1940)
 Charles Parker, radio documentary producer (born 1919)
 25 December – Fred Emney, comic performer (born 1900)

See also
 List of British films of 1980

References

 
Years of the 20th century in the United Kingdom
United Kingdom